Sitting In Limbo is the 2007 album by torch song singer Jessica Molaskey, featuring herself and her husband John Pizzarelli. Also on the album is John's younger brother Martin Pizzarelli, interspersed with guest appearances by tenor saxophonist Harry Allen.

Track listing

Personnel
Jessica Molaskeyvocals
John Pizzarelliguitar, vocals
Martin Pizzarellidouble-bass
Tony Tedescodrums
Harry Allentenor saxophone
Larry Goldings or Larry Fullerpiano

References

2007 albums
Jessica Molaskey albums